Dark Eyes is an album by Polish jazz trumpeter and composer Tomasz Stańko recorded in 2009 and released on the ECM label.

Reception
The Allmusic review by Michael G. Nastos awarded the album 3½ stars stating "With the late-night aspect emphasized and the ECM precept fully realized, Dark Eyes represents yet another triumph for this extraordinary artist, who always pulls back and digs deep into the wellspring of emotion with every passing moment".

Track listing
All compositions by Tomasz Stańko except as indicated.

 "So Nice" - 5:55
 "Terminal 7" - 5:30 
 "The Dark Eyes of Martha Hirsch" - 10:05
 "Grand Central" - 6:27
 "Amsterdam Avenue" - 6:13
 "Samba Nova" - 9:23 
 "Dirge for Europe" (Krzysztof Komeda) - 5:29 
 "May Sun" - 2:47 
 "Last Song" - 4:00
 "Etiuda Baletowa No.3" (Komeda) - 5:49

Personnel
Tomasz Stańko - trumpet
Jakob Bro - guitar
Alexi Tuomarila - piano
Anders Christensen - bass guitar
Olavi Louhivuori - drums

References

ECM Records albums
Tomasz Stańko albums
2009 albums
Albums produced by Manfred Eicher